Francisco Nicolás Veza Fragoso (born 6 December 1970), known as Paqui, is a Spanish retired footballer who played as a left back.

He played professionally for six clubs during 16 years, mainly Tenerife and Las Palmas.

Club career
Paqui was born in Alicante, Province of Valencia. An unsuccessful FC Barcelona youth graduate (only played for the Catalans' B-team) he went on to represent CD Tenerife, Real Zaragoza, Hércules CF and UD Las Palmas; he was instrumental in the latter's 2000 return to La Liga, and also served a loan to fellow league club CA Osasuna whilst under contract.

Paqui retired from the game in June 2004 after Las Palmas' relegation into the third division, totalling 221 matches and two goals in the Spanish top flight.

International career
Paqui was part of Spain's gold medal-winning squad at the 1992 Summer Olympics in Barcelona.

References

External links

1970 births
Living people
Footballers from Alicante
Spanish footballers
Association football defenders
La Liga players
Segunda División players
Segunda División B players
FC Barcelona C players
FC Barcelona Atlètic players
CD Tenerife players
Real Zaragoza players
Hércules CF players
UD Las Palmas players
CA Osasuna players
Spain youth international footballers
Spain under-21 international footballers
Footballers at the 1992 Summer Olympics
Olympic footballers of Spain
Olympic medalists in football
Olympic gold medalists for Spain
Medalists at the 1992 Summer Olympics